Carrie Rose (born 17 March 1993) is a British entrepreneur. She is a co-founder and CEO of Rise at Seven, a creative search agency, launched in 2019 with offices in the UK and USA. Rose was named as one of 2020's Campaign Magazines 30 under 30.

Career 
Rose graduated BA Digital Media at The University of Leeds in 2014.

Rose worked in search engine optimisation (SEO) for 7 years at various agencies in Leeds before founding a business.

In 2019, Rose applied for the BBC's The Apprentice TV show. She created a business plan and made it through to the final 30 but was rejected by the show because her  plan did not require any assistance. Instead, a private investor offered Rose enough cash to launch the business with co-founder Stephen Kenwright.

In 2020, Rose announced Rise at Seven began working with international clients, including Missguided, Boohoo and GAME. Rose also made headlines when the COVID-19 pandemic disrupted students' education and she offered to pay students' rent if they quit university and worked for her.

In 2021, Rose featured in The Times with an article about why she hires influencers.

References

Living people
1993 births
British women company founders
Alumni of the University of Leeds
Women founders
Chief executive officers
British women chief executives
British chief executives